Mobile Citizen may also refer to:
 IDB Mobile Citizen, is an initiative of the Science and Technology Division of the Inter-American Development Bank.
 Mobile Citizen (SD Gundam), a type of robotic character appearing in the SD Gundam franchise.

See also
 Citizen (disambiguation)